Matt Fish is an American cellist and a music producer.

Early life and education 
Fish was born in Lodi, California, and grew up in Dubuque, Iowa. He start playing piano at age five, and took up the cello at age nine. In high school Fish studied cello with George Work at Iowa State University and Charles Wendt at University of Iowa. He graduated from Indiana University School of Music, where he studied jazz with David Baker and classical cello with Helga Winold.

Career 
Fish moved to San Francisco and became a founding member of Combing Dolores, an acoustic jazz-folk trio. While in San Francisco, Fish recorded on the second album of singer/songwriter Matt Nathanson, Ernst.

In 2002 Fish began touring full-time with Matt Nathanson, and shortly after with Alejandro Escovedo.

Fish made television appearances on Austin City Limits, Jimmy Kimmel Live!, and the Craig Ferguson Show. He worked with producer John Cale, filmmaker Jonathan Demme, the band Earlimart, and singer k.d. lang.

In 2012, Fish continued to perform live shows with Nathanson.

Fish produced albums for David Hopkins, Justin Klump, and Supreme Fiction.

Music

Recordings - cellist 

 Conflict & Catalysis: Productions & Arrangements 1966-2006, John Cale
 M:FANS, John Cale
 Mercy, John Cale
 Recollection, k.d. lang
 Beneath These Fireworks, Matt Nathanson
 Still Waiting for Spring, Matt Nathanson
 Plus, Matt Nathanson 
 When Everything Meant Everything, Matt Nathanson
 Not Colored Too Perfect, Matt Nathanson
 Ernst, Matt Nathanson
 The Boxing Mirror, Alejandro Escovedo
 Room of Songs, Alejandro Escovedo
 Melodia, The Vines
 There Are Debts (feat. Damien Rice), David Hopkins
 Hymn and Her, Earlimart
 Mentor Tormentor, Earlimart
 On Approach, Everest
 Break Through The Silence, Monty Are I
 Threadbare, Port O'Brien
 Let There Be Light FM, Light FM
 In Between, Highwater Rising
 November, Dead End Angels
 Hotel San Jose, Go Go Market
 Indoor Universe, Paula Frazer
 The Curse of the Songwriter, Pi
 Footprints in the Sky, Stefanie Gleit
 To Remember, Josh Kelley
 Stop Talking, Chris Price

Soundtracks - cellist 

 American Wedding Soundtrack, Matt Nathanson cover of Laid (2003)
 November (directed by Greg Harrison, 2004)
 Jimmy Carter Man from Plains (directed by Jonathan Demme, 2007)
 When It's Dark (2009)
 Drifter: Henry Lee Lucas (2009)
 30 Days of Night: Dark Days (2010)

Recordings - producer 

 There Are Debts, David Hopkins (2010)
 Thousand Mile Dream, Justin Klump (2008)
 Supreme Fiction, self-titled EP (2008)

References

External links 
 
 Matt Fish at All Music 
 

Year of birth missing (living people)
Living people
American cellists
Musicians from California
People from Lodi, California
Record producers from California
Jacobs School of Music alumni